Syed Moazzem Hossain (1901–1991) was a Bangladeshi academic and Islamic scholar. He served as the vice-chancellor of the University of Dhaka.

Early life and education
Hossain was born on 1 August 1901, to a Bengali Muslim family of Syeds in the village of Baniara in Mirzapur, Tangail District. He earned his Master's in Arabic from the University of Dhaka in 1924. He then joined the same university as a research scholar in Bangla. In 1926, he went to Oxford University to obtain D Phil and D Litt degrees, writing his thesis on classical Arabic poetry. He then earned his LLD degree from Dalhousie University in 1949.

Career
He joined as a reader in the Department of Arabic at the University of Dhaka in 1930. He served as the vice-chancellor of the university during 1948–1953.

In 1984, he was awarded the Islamic Foundation Award for Education. He was also awarded the Ekushey Padak  in the year 1978 by the Bangladesh Government. List of Ekushey Padak award recipients (1976–79)

His published several books include Marifatul Ilmul Hadith, Kalbiatul Jahelia, Nakhbatum Min Kitabil Ektiarin and Kasidatu Jahelia.

References

1901 births
1991 deaths
People from Tangail District
University of Dhaka alumni
Academic staff of the University of Dhaka
Grammarians of Arabic
Alumni of the University of Oxford
Dalhousie University alumni
Vice-Chancellors of the University of Dhaka
Bangladeshi people of Arab descent
Bangladeshi Sunni Muslim scholars of Islam
Bengali Muslim scholars of Islam